Jim Reynolds (born January 10, 1938) was a Canadian football player who played for the Hamilton Tiger-Cats, Toronto Argonauts, Ottawa Rough Riders, and Montreal Alouettes. He won the Grey Cup with the Tiger-Cats in 1965. He played college football at Hillsdale College in Michigan.

References

1938 births
Hamilton Tiger-Cats players
Living people
Hillsdale College alumni
Toronto Argonauts players
Ottawa Rough Riders players
Montreal Alouettes players
People from Poland, Ohio